The 1981 World Table Tennis Championships men's singles was the 36th edition of the men's singles championship. 

Guo Yuehua defeated Cai Zhenhua in the final, winning three sets to one to secure the title.

Results

See also
List of World Table Tennis Championships medalists

References

-